Silver Spoons is an American sitcom that aired for four seasons on NBC from September 25, 1982 to May 11, 1986, and an additional fifth season in first-run syndication from September 27, 1986 to May 30, 1987. A total of 116 episodes were produced over the five seasons.

Series overview

Episodes

Season 1 (1982–83)

Season 2 (1983–84)

Season 3 (1984–85)

Season 4 (1985–86)

Season 5 (1986–87)

References

External links
 

Silver Spoons